Currin may refer to:

People
Brian Currin (born 1950), South African lawyer
David Maney Currin (1817–1864), Tennessee attorney and politician
Green Currin (c. 1842–1918), American politician
Jen Currin (born 2nd half of 20th century), American/Canadian author
John Currin (born 1962), American painter
Perry Currin (1928–2011), professional baseball player

Other uses
Currin Bridge, near Cottage Grove, Oregon, U.S.
Currin, County Fermanagh, a townland and civil parish in Northern Ireland

See also
 Curriñe, a village in Futrono, Chile